Cochin Refineries School is a higher secondary school situated in Kochi, Kerala, India. The school was relocated to its new campus near Vandipettah, Puthencruz on the 2nd of December, 2019.

Overview

The school was established in 1966 for the children of employees of erstwhile Kochi Refineries Ltd (KRL). Admission is open to children of  employees.

Previously, the school was situated on the hilltop of Jwalagiri, Ambalamugal. On the 2nd of December 2019, the school relocated to its new campus near Vandipettah. The school is run by Cochin Refineries Educational Aid Society and managed by a Board of Governors nominated by the management of BPCL – Kochi Refinery.  It is affiliated with the Central Board of Secondary Education (CBSE), New Delhi, and prepares students for the All India Secondary School Examination (AISSE) and All India Senior School Certificate Examination (AISSCE).

The motto of the school is "That they may be refined and radiate".

See also
List of schools in Ernakulam

References

External links
 School website

Private schools in Kochi
High schools and secondary schools in Kochi